Dundowran Beach is a coastal suburb in the Fraser Coast Region, Queensland, Australia.

Geography 
The suburb is bounded by the bay Hervey Bay to the north, Grinstead Road to the east, and Pialba Burrum Heads Road to the south.

The land in the west of the suburb is residential while the land is the east is still used for agriculture, a mix of crops and grazing on native vegetation. The northern boundary is a long sandy beach.

History 

Education 
There are no schools in Dundowran Beach. The nearest primary school is Yarrilee State School in Uraween to the south-east and Hervey Bay State High School in Pialba to the east.

References 

Suburbs of Hervey Bay
Coastline of Queensland